Marjane Satrapi (born 22 November 1969) is a French-Iranian  graphic novelist, cartoonist, illustrator, film director, and children's book author. Her best-known works include the graphic novel Persepolis and its film adaptation, the graphic novel Chicken with Plums, and the Marie Curie biopic Radioactive.

Biography
Satrapi was born in Rasht, Iran. She grew up in Tehran in an upper-middle class Iranian family and attended the French-language school, Lycée Razi. Both her parents were politically active and supported leftist causes against the monarchy of the last Shah. When the Iranian Revolution took place in 1979, they underwent rule by the Islamic fundamentalists who took power.

During her youth, Satrapi was exposed to the growing brutalities of the various regimes. Many of her family friends were persecuted, arrested, and even murdered. She found a hero in her paternal uncle, Anoosh, who had been a political prisoner and lived in exile in the Soviet Union for a time. Young Satrapi greatly admired her uncle, and he in turn doted on her, treating her more as a daughter than a niece. Once back in Iran, Anoosh was arrested again and sentenced to death. Anoosh was only allowed one visitor the night before his execution, and he requested Satrapi. His body was buried in an unmarked grave in the prison. It is said that Anoosh was the nephew of Fereydun Ebrahimi, Minister of Justice of Azerbaijan People's Government, a secessionist government that tried to secede from Pahlavi Persia in 1945.

Although Satrapi's parents encouraged her to be strong-willed and defend her rights, they grew concerned for her safety. Barely in her teens by this time, she was skirting trouble with police for disregarding modesty codes and buying music banned by the regime.

They arranged for her to live with a family friend, Zozo, to study abroad, and in 1983, at age fourteen, she arrived in Vienna, Austria, to attend the Lycée Français de Vienne. She stayed in Vienna through her high school years, often moving from one residence to another as situations changed, and sometimes stayed at friends' homes. Eventually, she was homeless and lived on the streets for three months, until she was hospitalized for an almost deadly bout of bronchitis. Upon recovery, she returned to Iran. She studied visual communication, eventually obtaining a master's degree from Islamic Azad University in Tehran.

Satrapi then married Reza, a veteran of the Iran–Iraq War, when she was 21, whom she later divorced. She then moved to Strasbourg, France. Her parents told her that Iran was no longer the place for her, and encouraged her to stay in Europe permanently.

Satrapi is currently married to Mattias Ripa, a Swedish national. They live in Paris. Apart from her native language, Persian, she speaks French, English, Swedish, German, and Italian.

Career

Comic books
Satrapi became famous worldwide because of her critically acclaimed autobiographical graphic novels, originally published in French in four parts in 2000–2003 and in English translation in two parts in 2003 and 2004, respectively, as Persepolis and Persepolis 2, which describe her childhood in Iran and her adolescence in Europe. Persepolis won the Angoulême Coup de Coeur Award at the Angoulême International Comics Festival. In 2013, Chicago schools were ordered by the district to remove Persepolis from classrooms because of the work's graphic language and violence. This banning incited protests and controversy. Her later publication, Embroideries (Broderies), was also nominated for the Angoulême Album of the Year award in 2003, an award that her graphic novel Chicken with Plums (Poulet aux prunes) won. She has also contributed to the Op-Ed section of The New York Times.

Comics Alliance listed Satrapi as one of 12 women cartoonists deserving of lifetime achievement recognition.

Satrapi prefers the term "comic books" to "graphic novels." "People are so afraid to say the word 'comic'," she told the Guardian newspaper in 2011. "It makes you think of a grown man with pimples, a ponytail and a big belly. Change it to 'graphic novel' and that disappears. No: it's all comics."

Films

Persepolis was adapted into an animated film of the same name. It debuted at the 2007 Cannes Film Festival in May 2007 and shared a Special Jury Prize with Carlos Reygadas's Silent Light (Luz silenciosa). Co-written and co-directed by Satrapi and director Vincent Paronnaud, the French-language picture stars the voices of Chiara Mastroianni, Catherine Deneuve, Danielle Darrieux, and Simon Abkarian. The English version, starring the voices of Gena Rowlands, Sean Penn, and Iggy Pop, was nominated for Best Animated Feature at the 80th Academy Awards in January 2008. Satrapi was the first woman to be nominated for the award. However, the Iranian government denounced the film and got it dropped from the Bangkok International Film Festival. Otherwise, Persepolis was a very successful film both commercially (with over a million admissions in France alone) as well as critically, winning Best First Film at the César Awards 2008. The film reflects many tendencies of first-time filmmaking in France (which makes up around 40% of all French cinema each year), notably in its focus on very intimate rites of passage, and quite ambivalently recounted coming-of-age moments.

Satrapi and Paronnaud continued their successful collaboration with a second film, a live-action adaptation of Chicken with Plums, released in late 2011. In 2012, Satrapi directed and acted in the comedy crime film Gang of the Jotas, from her own screenplay.

In 2014 Satrapi directed the comedy-horror film The Voices, from a screenplay by Michael R. Perry.

In 2019, Satrapi directed a biopic of two-time Nobel Prize winner Marie Curie, titled Radioactive.

Political activism
Following the Iranian elections in June 2009, Satrapi and Iranian filmmaker Mohsen Makhmalbaf appeared before Green Party members in the European Parliament to present a document allegedly received from a member of the Iranian electoral commission claiming that the reform candidate, Mir Hossein Mousavi, had actually won the election, and that the conservative incumbent Mahmoud Ahmedinejad had received only 12% of the vote.

Awards
2001: Angoulême Coup de Coeur Award for Persepolis
2002: Angoulême Prize for Scenario for Persepolis: Tome 2
2005: Angoulême Best Comic Book Award for Poulet aux prunes
2007: Jury Prize for Persepolis (tied with Silent Light), Cannes Film Festival
2007: Best Animation: Los Angeles Film Critics Association
2008: Gat Perich Award
2009: Doctor honoris causa both at the Katholieke Universiteit Leuven and the Université catholique de Louvain from Belgium
2013: Noor Iranian Film Festival award for Best Animation Director, for Chicken with Plums

Works

French

Sagesses et malices de la Perse (2001, with Lila Ibrahim-Ouali and Bahman Namwar-Motalg, Albin Michel)
Les monstres n'aiment pas la lune (2001, Nathan Jeunesse)
Ulysse au pays des fous (2001, with Jean-Pierre Duffour, Nathan Jeunesse)
Ajdar (2002, Nathan Jeunesse)
Broderies (2003, L'Association)

Le Soupir (2004, Bréal Jeunesse)

English

Embroideries (2005, Pantheon )

Monsters Are Afraid of the Moon (2006, Bloomsbury)
The Sigh (2011, Archaia)

Filmography

Notes

References

Further reading
 

Bhoori, Aisha (2014). "Reframing the Axis of Evil". Harvard Political Review

External links

 Persepolis film (2008) official website, Sony Picture Classics
 Marjane Satrapi, author at Random House
 Marjane Satrapi biography on Lambiek Comiclopedia
 "Princess of Darkness", interview by Robert Chalmers, The Independent (1 October 2006)
 Marjane Satrapi interview at Bookslut (2004)
 Marjane Satrapi interview at Powells.com (2006)
 Marjane Satrapi interview at Reviewgraveyard.com
 "Bringing Iran To The West: Marjane Satrapi's Persepolis" at The Culturatti
 The Comic World of Marjane Satrapi: Yearnings for a Lost Homeland
 Interview with Emma Watson at Vogue.com (2016)
 A Family Affair: Marjane Satrapi, the Iranian Revolution and the Iran-Iraq War by Women of War podcast

1969 births
French socialists
French comics artists
French female comics artists
French comics writers
French women film directors
French democracy activists
French graphic novelists
Iranian socialists
Iranian comics artists
Iranian comics writers
Iranian democracy activists
Iranian graphic novelists
21st-century Iranian women writers
Iranian expatriates in Austria
Iranian emigrants to France
Living people
People from Rasht
Iranian female comics artists
Female comics writers
Iranian women film directors
Islamic Azad University, Central Tehran Branch alumni
20th-century Iranian women writers
21st-century French women writers
21st-century French women artists
21st-century Iranian artists
20th-century Iranian artists
20th-century French women